Jane Doe is the fourth studio album by American metalcore band Converge, released on September 4, 2001 by Equal Vision Records. The album was produced by Matthew Ellard alongside guitarist Kurt Ballou, and the artwork was designed by lead vocalist Jacob Bannon. It was the band's first album to feature bassist Nate Newton and drummer Ben Koller, and the last to feature guitarist Aaron Dalbec; Converge's line-up has remained stable since.

Although Jane Doe did not chart, it was a commercial breakthrough for the band and received immediate acclaim, with critics praising its poetic lyrics, dynamics, ferocity and production. It has since been listed as one of the greatest albums of the metalcore genre by various publications, and has developed a cult following, with the cover art becoming an icon of the band. A live version titled Jane Live was released in 2017.

Writing and recording 
Bannon stated in an interview that many of the songs on Jane Doe came from the side project Supermachiner; the project was claimed to inspire Jane Doe's experimental side. The title track and "Phoenix in Flight" were initially intended for the Supermachiner album Rise of the Great Machine, but Bannon thought it made sense for Converge to play them. Ballou has stated that Koller "reinvigorated" the band and pushed them in a new direction, and that prior to Newton joining the band, Ballou was the dominant songwriter. Ballou has said with the addition of Newton that the album became more collaborative in terms of songwriting, which was not the case prior.

The band had a greater budget of $11,000 to work with on Jane Doe, and its recording process differed from previous releases as a result. The entire album was recorded on six reels of two inch tape at three studios and mixed in two. It was mostly recorded at Q Division Studios, next door to James Taylor's recording session. Newton later recalled: "He [Taylor] kept sending his engineer over to tell us to be quiet. 'Mr. Taylor is trying to record vocal tracks, and you guys are goofing off and being way too loud over here.'"

Additional recording took place at GodCity Studio and Fort Apache, and took around three years. The band recorded for seven days at Q Division using two rooms dubbed "Studio A" and "Studio B". Studio A was used to record the slower songs because the room was bigger than Studio B, which Ellard stated was more optimal for invoking ambience in their sound than Studio B. Studio B was used to record the more uptempo songs due to its smaller size.

Newton stated in an interview, "I remember all of us wanting to write a hardcore record the kids were going to hate." Matthew Ellard, engineer and producer of Jane Doe, said he saw the album as a "big rock record" rather than a metal record. Ballou has stated that Jane Doe is the first Converge album that he is "proud of from start to finish".

Musical style and themes 
Bannon stated that the album's lyrical themes were born out of a dissolving relationship and the emotional fallout from that experience.

The lyrics found in Jane Doe's liner notes differ from some of the lyrics on the recorded tracks. The booklet lists the lyrics of the opening track "Concubine" as "For I felt the greatest of winters coming/ And I saw you as seasons shifting from blue to grey/ That's where the coldest of these days await me/And distance lays her heavy head beside me/ There I'll stay gold, forever gold", although the only lyrics said in the song are "You stay gold/I'll stay gold". Scott Butterworth of Noisey said, "It's a somewhat confusing incongruity, but at the same time, it's eerily reminiscent of a moment most of us have experienced. If you've ever planned an eloquent, well-reasoned speech in your head only to feel too overwhelmed, too hurt, too emotional to spit it out when the time came, you can understand the brilliant trick Bannon is pulling here."

Artwork 
The artwork for Jane Doe was designed and created by Jacob Bannon. The booklet features lyrics for each song on the album, which are intentionally scattered and difficult to decipher. Bannon stated, "Visually, I just wanted to capture that disillusionment with relationships and channel the negatives I felt. I did this in hopes of creating some sort of positive out of all the negative I was experiencing." The result was a mystery created from a variety of media, collage, photography, spraypaint, and ink that Bannon then assembled digitally. The cover image has since become their "de facto icon". 

Bannon revealed in an interview that he abandoned multiple art projects to work on artwork for Jane Doe:"Abandoning several other ongoing art projects so he could work on Jane Doe exclusively for a month, Bannon applied the same meticulous process in creating all of the companion images that appear in the album's 28-page CD booklet. "Once I had the basic images completed, including the cover, I worked on type treatments for the release," he says. "At first I used old Letraset type but later switched to contemporary typography as the project progressed. My goal was to continue the same kinetic feel of the imagery and make them one and the same.""

Bannon first stated the cover image was not based on any original model but on October 5, 2021, French actress and model Audrey Marnay asserted she was the basis for the iconic "Jane Doe" artwork. In an Instagram post, Marnay claimed a photograph of her from the May 2001 issue of Marie Claire Italy magazine taken by Dutch fashion photographer Jan Welters was the original source artwork used by Bannon. The following day, Bannon acknowledged on his personal social media accounts as well as the band's that the photo referenced by Marnay was indeed a primary source used to create the original stencil used for the album's artwork.

Release and promotion 
In mid-2000, Converge self-released a three-track record titled Jane Doe Demos during their 2000 tour, which were limited to 100 copies. The CDs contained unreleased demo versions of "Bitter and Then Some" and "Thaw" from the upcoming album, as well as a cover of "Whatever I Do" by Negative Approach.

Jane Doe was released on September 4, 2001 through Equal Vision Records as a CD and double vinyl which came in multiple colors. Converge's first tour in support of Jane Doe was in September 2001 with Drowningman and Playing Enemy. Drowningman later dropped out of the tour to work on a new album.

In 2002, a music video was released for the tracks "Concubine" and "Fault and Fracture", directed by Zach Merck, a longtime friend of the band. The video was filmed on location in Los Angeles in over three days in September. The band stated on their website that "although it's always difficult to hand over creative control of a project, we can safely say [Merck] did a commendable job on the project", and also gave special thanks to Ashley for "sitting in a bathtub of blood for over two hours".

Bannon's Deathwish Inc (under exclusive license from Equal Vision) repressed the album on vinyl, accompanied by a 28-page booklet. The double LP became available for pre-order at the Deathwish web store on April 1, 2010, and then became available in August 2010.

Reception and legacy

Jane Doe received wider acclaim than Converge's previous albums, with Terrorizer Magazine naming it their Album of the Year. Christopher Dare of Pitchfork Media awarded the album with a rating of 7.7 out of 10, deeming it "so full of intelligence, skill and intensity that it's simply masterful." Blake Butler of Allmusic stated that Converge "put the final sealing blow on their status as a legend in the world of metallic hardcore" with the album, calling it "an experience -- an encyclopedic envelopment of so much at once." In 2007, Decibel magazine placed the album at number 35 on its "Decibel Hall of Fame" list, and later named it the best album of the 2000s. J. Bennett wrote that Jane Doe "was both a semi-melodic milestone ("Hell to Pay", "Phoenix in Flight", the title track) and a discordant landmark (everything else), far and away the most crucial metallic hardcore record since Cave In unleashed Until Your Heart Stops three years earlier". Sputnikmusic placed Jane Doe at number one on its list of the best albums of the 2000s, and Loudwire placed the album at number ten on its list of the 11 best metal albums of the 2000s. In March 2011, Jane Doe was inducted into the Rock Sound's Hall of Fame, who described it as "a gamechanger in the entire realm of heavy music".

The album has exerted considerable influence in extreme music circles and attained a cult following. Japanese band Heaven in Her Arms are named after the song of the same name.

Accolades 

A "—" denotes the publication's list is in no particular order, and Jane Doe did not rank numerically.

Track listing

Personnel
Jane Doe personnel adapted from CD liner notes.

Converge
 Jacob Bannon – vocals
 Kurt Ballou – guitar, vocals, theremin
 Aaron Dalbec – guitar
 Nate Newton – bass, vocals, theremin
 Ben Koller – drums

Guest musicians
 Kevin Baker (The Hope Conspiracy) – backing vocals on "The Broken Vow"
 Tre McCarthy (Deathwish Inc.) – backing vocals on "The Broken Vow"
 Caleb Scofield credited as "Secret C" – backing vocals on 	"The Broken Vow"

Artwork and design
 Atomic! ID – art direction and design
Production and recording history
 Fred Archambalt – recording assistant
 Kurt Ballou – recording, pre-production, mixing
 Jacob Bannon – mixing
 Matt Beaudoin – recording assistant
 Mathew Ellard – recording, mixing
 Alan Douches – mastering
 Andy Hong – pre-production
 Carl Plaster – drum tech
 Recorded at Q Division, God City and Fort Apache
 Mixed at Fort Apache
 Mastered at West West Side
 All recording and mixing was performed in an analog format.

Notes

References

External links
 

Converge (band) albums
2001 albums
Equal Vision Records albums
Deathwish Inc. albums
Albums produced by Kurt Ballou
Albums with cover art by Jacob Bannon